Events from the year 1625 in Denmark.

Incumbents 
 Monarch – Christian IV

Events
 25 January – The Danish West India Company is granted an eight-year monopoly on trade with  the West Indies, Virginia, Brazil and Guinea.
 9 December – The Treaty of The Hague leads to Denmark's intervention in the  Thirty Years' War.

Births
 13 August – Rasmus Bartholin, physician and grammarian (died 1709)
 16 June  Peder Hansen Resen, historian and legal scholar (died 1688)

Deaths 
 8 July – Elizabeth of Denmark, Duchess of Brunswick-Wolfenbüttel, princess (born 1573)
 14 September  Pieter Isaacsz, painter (born c. 1569)

Full date missing
 Truid Aagesenm composer (born 1593)

References 

 
Denmark
Years of the 17th century in Denmark